Paul Balmer (born 1970) is a Swiss mathematician, working in algebra. He is a professor of mathematics at the University of California, Los Angeles.

Balmer received his Ph.D. from the University of Lausanne in 1998, under the supervision of Manuel Ojanguren, with a thesis entitled Groupes de Witt dérivés des Schémas (in French).

His research centers around triangulated categories. More specifically, he is a proponent of tensor-triangular geometry, an umbrella topic which covers geometric aspects of algebraic geometry, modular representation theory, stable homotopy theory, and other areas, by means of relevant tensor-triangulated categories.

Balmer was an Invited Speaker at the International Congress of Mathematicians in Hyderabad in 2010, with a talk on Tensor Triangular Geometry. In 2012, he became a fellow of the American Mathematical Society. He was awarded the Humboldt Prize in 2015.

References

1970 births
20th-century American mathematicians
21st-century American mathematicians
Living people
Fellows of the American Mathematical Society
Swiss mathematicians
University of Lausanne alumni
University of California, Los Angeles faculty